John Connell may refer to:
 John Connell (artist), American artist
 John Connell (actor), American actor
 John Henry Connell, Australian hotelier and patron of the arts

See also
 John Connill, Irish soldier